Nguyễn Khoa Tóc Tiên (born 13 May 1989), known simply as Tóc Tiên, is a Vietnamese singer, model and actress. Beginning her career as a child, Tiên later became a teen idol, participating in several singing competitions and releasing two studio albums: Nụ cười nắng mai (2007) and Tóc Tiên thiếu nữ (2008). Her third solo album, My Turn (2009), projects a new, sexually-charged image which she adopted while living in the United States and performing frequently on Thúy Nga Productions variety show, Paris by Night. Tiên appeared in the first season of the television series, The Remix, in 2015. The show gave her an opportunity to perform "Ngày mai (Vũ điệu cồng chiêng)", the song which brought her success and later became one of her signature hits. Subsequent singles, notably "Em không là duy nhất" and "#Catena (Có ai thương em như anh)", were moderately successful.

Tiên made her film debut in Già gân, mỹ nhân và găng tơ (2015), and has signed numerous endorsement deals. On television, she hosted Bài hát Việt in 2008 and was a judge on The Voice of Vietnam and Vietnam Idol Kids. Her accolades include three Làn Sóng Xanh Awards, two Yan Vpop 20 Awards, an Mnet Asian Music Award, a Zing Music Award, an LGBT Appreciation Award and a Vietnamese Elle Style Award.

Early life and career

Family
Nguyễn Khoa Tóc Tiên was born to Nguyễn Trung Kiên, a businessman, and Kim Loan, a former ballet dancer and aerobics instructor, and raised in Ho Chi Minh City, Vietnam. Her wealthy family focused on education for generations and employed a strict parenting style, particularly her mother. Tiên has defended her mother's strictness, saying that she was protecting her from the risks of entering show business at an early age. The singer has two younger brothers, one of whom received a President's Education Award in 2015.

Early career
Tiên was four when her family discovered her singing ability and allowed her to join the performing group of the Children's House of Ho Chi Minh City. She began booking singing and modeling jobs, appearing in several music videos while being managed by her mother. For her first singing competition Đi tìm Ngôi sao Close-Up at the age of 13, she claimed she was 18 to meet their entry requirements. After she was one of the show's twelve finalists, Tiên supported musician Thế Hiến on his 2002 nationwide Đợi chờ trong cơn mưa concert tour, which marked her debut as an adult singer.

In September 2003, Tiên signed up for the music competition Yo! Cùng ước mơ xanh and added two years to her age. The show ended with four winners—Tóc Tiên, Nam Cường, Minh Thư and Viết Thanh—joining a short-lived group, Yo! Band; its members later went on to have solo careers. Tiên began studying biology at Lê Hồng Phong High School, one of Vietnam's most prestigious high schools, in 2004. Although her grades were generally good until her graduation in 2007, they sometimes suffered due to her work schedule. The singer took vocal lessons at the city's conservatory and played for her district's volleyball team.

She was the Most Notable Face in Người đẹp qua ảnh, a 2005 Fujifilm modeling contest, and was recognized for songs such as "Tuổi teen tóc mây", "Rock học trò" and "Cô bé tóc xù". Tiên made her acting debut when she was the first actress to portray doctor Đặng Thùy Trâm for a segment aired on the VTV3 talk show Người đương thời. She later participated in Tiếng hát truyền hình toàn quốc giải Sao Mai, her third singing competition; this surprised many since Tiên was an established performer at the time. "I came to the competition to prove myself, not to test my abilities," she said. One of eighteen Southern finalists, Tiên sang Đỗ Bảo's "Bài hát cho em" on 19 November 2005, live show but lost.

Tiên contributed vocals to two tracks on Quốc Bảo's 2006 album V, including "Chung thân", the song that was later included in Ngọc Hiệp-directed short film Con rối. During an interview, the singer announced that an album was in the works and she would take a year off from singing to prepare for the national university-entrance examination. Tiên said several times that she wanted to be a doctor, with her singing career a "side job". Her mother scheduled the album's recording for the summer to ensure that her daughter could focus on studying. The singer released her debut album, Nụ cười nắng mai, in February 2007. After the July examination, Tiên was not admitted to her first-choice school, Ho Chi Minh City Medicine and Pharmacy University's Faculty of Medicine, and opted for the university's Faculty of Traditional Medicine.

In May 2008, Tiên began co-hosting the fourth season of Bài hát Việt with Anh Tuấn and Lại Văn Sâm. Quốc Bảo, Phương Uyên and other songwriters were enlisted for her second album, Tóc Tiên thiếu nữ, which was scheduled for release in June. Tiên undertook her first high-school tour Tóc Tiên và những giấc mơ in September, traveling to six schools in Ho Chi Minh City, Đồng Nai Province and Hanoi. In a 2014 interview for Elle Man Vietnam, Tóc Tiên stated that her childhood was "definitely different from [her] peers." She added: "Besides the pressuring study at school, I was following a singing career, I had to do photoshoots, interviews, etc. When my friends were having their days off, I was taking advantage of my time to do homework backstage at concerts or film studios."

Move to the United States

Early in 2011, Tiên rushed to finish a collaborative album with her long-time friend, singer Wanbi Tuấn Anh, before moving with her family to Los Angeles in March. Chuyện tình vượt thời gian, a collection of their past and new collaborations, was released in June. A concert promoting the album was planned then canceled. Tiên had begun her undergraduate studies at Pasadena City College, majoring in biology, and intended to obtain a Bachelor of Science degree to study medicine at the University of California, Los Angeles. When she arrived in LA, she signed a contract with Thúy Nga Productions, a US-based record label which managed many overseas Vietnamese artists. By 2016, Tiên had appeared on more than forty episodes of Thúy Nga's direct-to-video variety series Paris by Night, starting with her performance of "Tóc mây" on the 96th installment in June 2009.

She sang part-time to finance her education, performing in clubs and casinos across the US. In September 2010, Tiên made a cameo appearance on Wanbi Tuấn Anh's music video for "Bắt sóng cảm xúc" and was featured on the song's R&B remix. Her third solo studio album My Turn was released in August 2011, and includes contributions from Dương Khắc Linh, Nguyễn Hải Phong, Thanh Bùi and others. In May 2012, music videos for three album tracks and her Paris by Night performances were included on the compilation video release The Best of Tóc Tiên. After a number of collaborations with Mai Tiến Dũng on the variety series, their joint album Mystical Night was released in August. In July 2013, Tiên reported that she had transferred to California State University, Long Beach and changed her major to communication studies to balance her education and career; however, she eventually dropped out.

Vietnam comeback, breakthrough and television endeavors
In October 2014, Tiên planned a few projects to rebuild her career in Vietnam, but hesitated over whether or not to stay permanently. This was followed by the release of two singles, "Tell Me Why" in November and "Ngày mai" in February 2015, with the former's video causing controversy over its provocative nature. She joined the cast of music competition The Remix in December, despite initially rejecting the offer. TeamV—which consists of Tiên and producers Touliver and Long Halo—would go against other notable acts such as Sơn Tùng M-TP and Đông Nhi, to create the best remix work on the program. In April, her performance of "Ngày mai" on the fourth live show was a success. The song's new mix with the choreography, both named "Vũ điệu cồng chiêng", immediately went viral. It was awarded a 2015 Pops Award for Most Covered Music Video, a nomination for Song of the Year at the 2015 Làn Sóng Xanh Awards, a nomination for Music Video of the Year at the 2015 Dedication Music Awards, a 2016 Zing Music Award for Most Favorite Dance/Electronic Song, and the annual Top Hit title from television show Vietnam Top Hits. Many publications called the track her signature hit. Her team went on to debut other singles on the competition including "D.C.M.A. (Đâu cần một ai)" in June, which features BigDaddy and Andree, before finishing the show in fourth place.

In December 2015, Tiên starred in her first comedy film Già gân, mỹ nhân và găng tơ as Quỳnh Cherry, a DJ on the run from a group of gangsters. However, both the film and her performance received negative reviews from critics. In January 2016, she won Best Female Artist at the Yan Vpop 20 Awards and performed "I'm in Love" and "Big Girls Don't Cry". These two singles were from her then-upcoming extended play T. The album's lead track "The Beat of Celebration" featuring BigDaddy, JustaTee and Touliver, brought her the Silver Music Video and Most Effective Performer awards from Bài hát tôi yêu. With the Vietnamese dubbed–Kung Fu Panda 3, the singer voiced Mỹ Mỹ, a translated version of the original's animated character Mei Mei. In March, she recorded "Một con đường hai ngã rẽ" for the soundtrack of the comedy film Taxi, em tên gì?. Tiên later became a prominent judge on the first seasons of Tài năng DJ and Vietnam Idol Kids in May, following her guest judging appearances on various television series. She also appeared as guest mentor on four episodes of The Face Vietnam first season and on its live finale aired in October. A string of musical releases served for Tóc Tiên's advertising campaigns were conducted afterwards. Dutch producer Afrojack and rap artist Suboi joined one of them, "Tâm điểm ánh nhìn (All Eyes on Us)", the trio's song for Budweiser released in December.

Early in 2017, the singer became a judge on the first season of Mặt nạ ngôi sao—the Vietnamese version of the Korean singing competition King of Mask Singer—and a coach on the fourth season of The Voice of Vietnam. Her team's contestant, Hiền Hồ, won the latter show's second place and appeared with her on a duet titled "Hôn" in June. Tiên also released a few other singles throughout the year, including: "Em không là duy nhất" in February, which was successful, "Walk Away" in May, and "Hôm nay tôi cô đơn quá", a collaboration with Rhymastic, in August. She was awarded a 2017 Mnet Asian Music Award for Best Asian Artist in Vietnam in November, and a V Live Award for Best Iconic Star in January 2018, and was also included in the top five most favorite singers at the Làn Sóng Xanh Awards for the third consecutive year. "Hôm nay tôi cô đơn quá" later received both Single and Song of the Year nominations at the Làn Sóng Xanh and Dedication Music Awards, respectively. Her singles, "Thì em vẫn thế" and "Phút giây tuyệt vời", were released in February and April 2018, respectively.

Artistry and public image

From the start of her career, Tiên had a generally wholesome image as a teen idol. Quốc Bảo and Đỗ Bảo music along with pop jazz, blues and R&B were said to be her main inspirations. Nonetheless, she was better known for her teen pop sound with lyrics often having school-related imagery. The singer herself had expressed a wish to perform lyrically adult and mature songs, but her mother, who managed at the time, opposed the idea. In spite of this, her debut Nụ cười nắng mai still went for a more "grown-up" approach and was a departure from earlier works. Producer Quốc Bảo, who worked on her first two studio releases, chose R&B as the material's dominant influence and a new direction for her music. Her follow-up Chuyện tình vượt thời gian with Wanbi Tuấn Anh has the two performing and covering a handful of love songs, in genres such as blues jazz and alternative rock.

In the past, the singer was nicknamed "Cô bé tóc xù" by the press for her signature long and "frizzy" black hair. In March 2013, she changed her hairstyle to a pixie cut after a series of photoshoots and performances where she offered a more provocative image. Tiên later said that the hair cut was one of the "turning points" that helped her discover herself, while the image change was a "natural" progression, a result of her time working in the States. Her third solo album My Turn reflected this style both visually and musically at its early stage. After having worked with Touliver and Long Halo on The Remix, Tiên focused on electronic dance music later in her career. The trio's successful collaboration, "Ngày mai (Vũ điệu cồng chiêng)", was made famous by the chorus that infused house music with the use of drum and percussion, all creating a notable gong-like sound. Moreover, elements of trap were used in several productions of her subsequent singles.

Tiên has cited Beyoncé, Rihanna and Jolin Tsai as major influences on her showmanship. Stylistically, the singer has been described as a fashion icon and was compared many times to Miley Cyrus and Rihanna. Talking specifically about Cyrus, Tiên said she understood the comparisons because of the similarities between their starts as teen stars and their later reinventions moving into adulthood. In 2015, she was given a Vietnamese Elle Style Award for Most Stylish Upcoming Female Singer. Fashion brand Juno created a fall collection called Juno & Tóc Tiên in 2017, which was inspired by the singer's style. Aside from her deal with Juno, Tiên has accepted numerous brand endorsement offers and was dubbed as the "queen of endorsements". When she endorsed I-Mobile phones in 2008, the company purchased 11,000 physical copies of Tóc Tiên thiếu nữ to give away as gifts to phone buyers. Other brands that she has promoted include Pepsi, OPPO Electronics' smartphones, Toshiba and PNJSilver.

Tiên is a Christian and stated that her religious faith brought her back to her home country to rebuild her career. She is also a supporter of LGBT rights. She dedicated her performance of "Ngày mai" on The Remix and her single "Hôn" to the community. Comedians BB Trần and Tiko Tiến Công appeared in drag for her music video of "I'm in Love". The appearances created divided opinions, with some critics accusing the characters of disrespecting transgender people. For her work in support of the community, the singer was awarded the Most Influential Person Voted by the Public category at the LGBT Appreciation Awards in 2016. Also for the "I'm in Love" music video, Tiên invited female celebrities such Nguyễn Cao Kỳ Duyên and Tiên Tiên to make cameo appearances and show their support for feminism and against violence against women.

Personal life
Tiên started dating basketball player Chong Paul in December 2007 after they met at a high school event. Despite their age gap (Tiên was 19 and Chong Paul was 27 when they first dated), her parents approved of the relationship, but only under strict monitoring. In July 2013, the singer confirmed that they had split up. Many articles have since linked her in a relationship with producer Touliver, but both have denied these claims. In 2017, Tiên referred to herself as "single".

In a letter Tiên penned to her mother in September 2013, she revealed the two have not spoken to each other since her switch from medical to communication studies, and that her image change made her mother "furious". The singer added that she did not want to be a doctor, as that was only her family's wish. Despite this, she expressed a desire to reconcile with her mother in many interviews and on social media, even claiming the strained relationship caused her to be depressed for a long period. When asked about the current state of their relationship in August 2017, Tiên replied saying she "didn't even know" if it would be fixed or not. "It's difficult to solve the conflicts [between me and my mother]. They're not just simply generation gap conflicts, they involved the ways of thinking from each individual. So to say if the problems have been solved, I'd say they haven't," she said.

Tiên married Hoàng Touliver on 20 February 2020, their wedding mass formally took place in Dalat Cathedral located in Dalat city.

Discography
Nụ cười nắng mai (2007)
Tóc Tiên thiếu nữ (2008)
Chuyện tình vượt thời gian (2009) (with Wanbi Tuấn Anh)
My Turn (2011)
Mystical Night (2012) (with Mai Tiến Dũng)

Filmography

Film roles

Television roles

Music video appearances

Tours

Headlining
Tóc Tiên và những giấc mơ (2008)

Supporting act
Đợi chờ trong cơn mưa (with Thế Hiển) (2002)

Awards and nominations

Notes

References

External links

 

1989 births
Living people
People from Ho Chi Minh City
21st-century Vietnamese women singers
Vietnamese pop singers
Vietnamese idols
Feminist musicians
MAMA Award winners
People educated at Le Hong Phong High School
Vietnamese emigrants to the United States